Westsyde (Shuswap language: Simpcwétkwe) is a residential neighbourhood in the city of Kamloops, British Columbia, Canada. It is located along the west bank of the North Thompson River. The 2001 Canadian Census put the population of Westsyde at 7797.

Schools
Westsyde Secondary School
David Thompson Elementary School
Arthur Stevenson Elementary School
École Collines-D'Or Elementary School
Westmount Elementary School

Parks
Westsyde Centennial Park - at the end of Franklin Road
The park has plenty of amenities, including:

- a waterpark/splash park for younger children

- a fenced dog park area attached. It is an off-leash area located on the NE side of the dyke only.

- Little Farmers Petting Zoo (located at the entrance of the park off of Franklin Road)

Little Farmer's Petting Zoo & Exotic Birds 
North Thompson Oxbows Jensen Island Provincial Park

Events
Westsyde Dayz (ended) This event was hosted by the volunteer group Westsyde Community Development Society and although it was a well attended and fun event the society could not find enough volunteers and sponsors to continue the event. The society hosts many other events throughout the year including dances, small business & craft fairs, and team events)
Halloween Fireworks - Set off annually from "Turtle Hump" on 31 October (paid for by donations)

Sport
Golf Dunes at Westsyde
Swimming - Westsyde Pool has a 25m 6 lane pool, diving board, hot tub, water slide, climbing wall, tarzan rope, weight room, sauna and steam rooms, and is equipped with care aide/family change room and baby change tables. Approx. 1,000 sq. ft. activity room available to rent.
Hiking/fishing - Access to the Lac Du Bois Grasslands Park and Deep Lake (parking at Westsyde Shopping Centre and trail access from off of Ida Lane)

References

Neighbourhoods in Kamloops